The 73rd United States Congress was a meeting of the legislative branch of the United States federal government, composed of the United States Senate and the United States House of Representatives. It met in Washington, D.C. from March 4, 1933, to January 3, 1935, during the first two years of Franklin D. Roosevelt's presidency. Because of the newly ratified 20th Amendment, the duration of this Congress, along with the term of office of those elected to it, was shortened by  days. The apportionment of seats in the House of Representatives was based on the 1930 United States census.

The Democrats greatly increased their majority in the House, and won control of the Senate for the first time since the 65th Congress in 1917. With Franklin D. Roosevelt being sworn in as president on March 4, 1933, this gave the Democrats an overall federal government trifecta, also for the first time since the 65th Congress.

Major events

March 4, 1933: Franklin D. Roosevelt became President of the United States
January 3, 1934: The second session of 73rd Congress convened as mandated by the Twentieth Amendment to the United States Constitution, that had been ratified one year earlier
 August 19, 1934: House Speaker Henry Thomas Rainey died of a heart attack.  The House had already completed its work for this Congress and had already adjourned.  No Speaker was elected until the next Congress.

Major legislation

First Session
The first session of Congress, known as the "Hundred Days", took place before the regular seating and was called by President Roosevelt specifically to pass two acts:
 March 9, 1933: The Emergency Banking Act (ch. 1) was enacted within four hours of its introduction. It was prompted by the "bank holiday" and was the first step in Roosevelt's "first hundred days" of the New Deal. The Act was drafted in large part by officials appointed by the Hoover administration. The bill provided for the Treasury Department to initiate reserve requirements and a federal bailout to large failing institutions. It also removed the United States from the Gold Standard. All banks had to undergo a federal inspection to deem if they were stable enough to re-open. Within a week 1/3 of the banks re-opened in the United States and faith was, in large part, restored in the banking system. The act had few opponents, only taking fire from the farthest left elements of Congress who wanted to nationalize banks altogether.
 March 10, 1933: The Economy Act of 1933. Roosevelt, in sending this act to Congress, warned that if it did not pass, the country faced a billion-dollar deficit. The act balanced the federal budget by cutting the salaries of government employees and cutting pensions to veterans by as much as 15 percent. It intended to reassure the deficit hawks that the new president was fiscally conservative. Although the act was heavily protested by left-leaning members of congress, it passed by an overwhelming margin.

The session also passed several other major pieces of legislation:

March 31, 1933: The Civilian Conservation Corps Reforestation Relief Act (ch. 17) established the Civilian Conservation Corps (CCC) as a means to combat unemployment and poverty.
 May 12, 1933: The Agricultural Adjustment Act (ch. 25) was part of a plan developed by Roosevelt's Secretary of Agriculture, Henry A. Wallace, and was designed to protect American farmers from the uncertainties of the depression through subsidies and production controls. The act laid the frame for long-term government control in the planning of the agricultural sector. In 1936 the act was ruled unconstitutional by the United States Supreme Court because it taxed one group to pay for another.
 May 12, 1933: The Federal Emergency Relief Act (ch. 30) established the Federal Emergency Relief Administration (FERA) which develop public works projects to give work to the unemployed.
 May 18, 1933: The Tennessee Valley Authority Act (ch. 32) created the Tennessee Valley Authority to relieve the Tennessee Valley by a series of public works projects.
 June 5, 1933: The Securities Act of 1933 (ch. 38) established the Securities Exchange Commission (SEC) as a way for the government to prevent a repeat of the Stock Market Crash of 1929.
 June 12, 1933: The Glass–Steagall Act of 1933 (ch. 89) was a follow up to the Glass–Steagall Act of 1932. Both acts sought to make banking safer and less prone to speculation. The 1933 act, however, established the Federal Deposit Insurance Corporation.
 June 16, 1933: The National Industrial Recovery Act ("NIRA", ch. 90) was an anti-deflation scheme promoted by the Chamber of Commerce that reversed anti-trust laws and permit trade associations to cooperate in stabilizing prices within their industries while making businesses ensure that the incomes of workers would rise along with their prices. It guaranteed to workers of the right of collective bargaining and helped spur major union organizing drives in major industries. In case consumer buying power lagged behind, thereby defeating the administration's initiatives, the NIRA created the Public Works Administration (PWA), a major program of public works spending designed to alleviate unemployment, and moreover to transfer funds to certain beneficiaries. The NIRA established the most important, but ultimately least successful provision: a new federal agency known as the National Recovery Administration (NRA), which attempted to stabilize prices and wages through cooperative "code authorities" involving government, business, and labor. The NIRA was seen hailed as a miracle, responding to the needs of labor, business, unemployment, and the deflation crisis. The "sick chicken case" led to the Supreme Court invalidating NIRA in 1935.

Second Session
 March 24, 1934: The Tydings–McDuffie Act provided for self-government for the Commonwealth of the Philippines and a pathway to independence.
 June 6, 1934: The Securities Exchange Act of 1934 (ch. 404) grew out of the Securities Act of 1933 and regulated participation in financial markets.
 June 6, 1934: The National Firearms Act of 1934 (ch. 757) regulated machine guns, short-barreled rifles and shotguns.
 June 19, 1934: Communications Act of 1934 (ch. 652)

Constitutional amendments
 December 5, 1933: Twenty-first Amendment to the United States Constitution, repealing the eighteenth amendment and thus ending prohibition in the United States, was ratified by the requisite number of states (then 36) to become part of the Constitution

Hearings

"Merchants of Death"
Committee: United States Senate Special Committee on Investigation of the Munitions Industry
Chairman: Senator Gerald P. Nye (R)
Duration: September 4, 1934 – February 24, 1936

The Senate Munitions Committee came into existence solely for the purpose of this hearing. Although World War I had been over for sixteen years, there were revived reports that America's leading munition companies had effectively influenced the United States into that conflict, which killed 53,000 Americans, hence the companies' nickname "Merchants of Death".

The Democratic Party, controlling the Senate for the first time since the first world war, used the hype of these reports to organize the hearing in hopes of nationalizing America's munitions industry. The Democrats chose a Republican renowned for his ardent isolationist policies, Senator Gerald P. Nye of North Dakota, to head the hearing. Nye was typical of western agrarian progressives, and adamantly opposed America's involvement in any foreign war. Nye declared at the opening of the hearing "when the Senate investigation is over, we shall see that war and preparation for war is not a matter of national honor and national defense, but a matter of profit for the few."

Over the next 18 months, the "Nye Committee" (as newspapers called it) held 93 hearings, questioning more than 200 witnesses, including J.P. Morgan Jr. and Pierre du Pont. Committee members found little hard evidence of an active conspiracy among arms makers, yet the panel's reports did little to weaken the popular prejudice against "greedy munitions interests."

The hearings overlapped the 73rd and 74th Congresses. They only came to an end after Chairman Nye provoked the Democratic caucus into cutting off funding. Nye, in the last hearing the Committee held in early 1936, attacked former Democratic President Woodrow Wilson, suggesting that Wilson had withheld essential information from Congress as it considered a declaration of war. Democratic leaders, including Appropriations Committee Chairman Carter Glass of Virginia, unleashed a furious response against Nye for "dirtdaubing the sepulcher of Woodrow Wilson." Standing before cheering colleagues in a packed Senate chamber, Glass slammed his fist onto his desk in protest until blood dripped from his knuckles, effectively prompting the Democratic caucus to withhold all funding for further hearings.

Although the "Nye Committee" failed to achieve its goal of nationalizing the arms industry, it inspired three congressional neutrality acts in the mid-1930s that signaled profound American opposition to overseas involvement.

Party summary
For details, see Changes in membership, below.

Senate

There were 48 states with two senators per state, this gave the Senate 96 seats. Membership changed with four deaths, one resignation, and two appointees who were replaced by electees.

House of Representatives

Membership changed with twelve deaths and three resignations.

Leadership

Senate
 President: John Nance Garner (D)
 President pro tempore: Key Pittman (D)

Majority (Democratic) leadership
 Majority Leader and Democratic Conference Chairman: Joseph T. Robinson
 Assistant Majority Leader (Majority Whip): J. Hamilton Lewis
 Democratic Caucus Secretary: Hugo Black

Minority (Republican) leadership
 Minority Leader: Charles L. McNary
 Assistant Minority Leader (Minority Whip): Felix Hebert
 Republican Conference Chairman: Charles L. McNary
 Republican Conference Secretary:  Frederick Hale
 National Senatorial Committee Chair: Daniel O. Hastings

House of Representatives
 Speaker: Henry T. Rainey (D), until August 19, 1934 (Vacant thereafter)

Majority (Democratic) leadership
 Majority Leader: Joseph W. Byrns
 Majority Whip: Arthur H. Greenwood
 Democratic Caucus Chairman: Clarence F. Lea

Minority (Republican) leadership
 Minority Leader: Bertrand H. Snell
 Minority Whip: Harry L. Englebright
 Republican Conference Chairman: Robert Luce
 Republican Campaign Committee Chairman: Chester C. Bolton

Members

Senate
Senators are popularly elected statewide every two years, with one-third beginning new six-year terms with each Congress. Preceding the names in the list below are Senate class numbers, which indicate the cycle of their election, In this Congress, Class 1 meant their term ended with this Congress, requiring reelection in 1934; Class 2 meant their term began in the last Congress, requiring reelection in 1936; and Class 3 meant their term began in this Congress, requiring reelection in 1938.

Alabama
 2. John H. Bankhead II (D)
 3. Hugo Black (D)

Arizona
 1. Henry F. Ashurst (D)
 3. Carl Hayden (D)

Arkansas
 2. Joseph Taylor Robinson (D)
 3. Hattie Wyatt Caraway (D)

California
 1. Hiram Johnson (R)
 3. William G. McAdoo (D)

Colorado
 2. Edward P. Costigan (D)
 3. Alva B. Adams (D)

Connecticut
 1. Frederic C. Walcott (R)
 3. Augustine Lonergan (D)

Delaware
 1. John G. Townsend Jr. (R)
 2. Daniel O. Hastings (R)

Florida
 1. Park Trammell (D)
 3. Duncan U. Fletcher (D)

Georgia
 2. Walter F. George (D)
 3. Richard B. Russell Jr. (D)

Idaho
 2. William E. Borah (R)
 3. James P. Pope (D)

Illinois
 2. J. Hamilton Lewis (D)
 3. William H. Dieterich (D)

Indiana
 1. Arthur Raymond Robinson (R)
 3. Frederick Van Nuys (D)

Iowa
 2. L. J. Dickinson (R)
 3. Richard L. Murphy (D)

Kansas
 2. Arthur Capper (R)
 3. George McGill (D)

Kentucky
 2. Marvel M. Logan (D)
 3. Alben W. Barkley (D)

Louisiana
 2. Huey P. Long (D)
 3. John H. Overton (D)

Maine
 1. Frederick Hale (R)
 2. Wallace H. White Jr. (R)

Maryland
 1. Phillips Lee Goldsborough (R)
 3. Millard E. Tydings (D)

Massachusetts
 1. David I. Walsh (D)
 2. Marcus A. Coolidge (D)

Michigan
 1. Arthur H. Vandenberg (R)
 2. James Couzens (R)

Minnesota
 1. Henrik Shipstead (FL)
 2. Thomas D. Schall (R)

Mississippi
 1. Hubert D. Stephens (D)
 2. Pat Harrison (D)

Missouri
 1. Roscoe C. Patterson (R)
 3. Joel Bennett Clark (D)

Montana
 1. Burton K. Wheeler (D)
 2. John E. Erickson (D), March 13, 1933 – November 7, 1934
 James E. Murray (D), from November 7, 1934

Nebraska
 1. Robert B. Howell (R), until March 11, 1933
 William H. Thompson (D), May 24, 1933 – November 7, 1934
 Richard C. Hunter (D), from November 7, 1934
 2. George W. Norris (R)

Nevada
 1. Key Pittman (D)
 3. Patrick A. McCarran (D)

New Hampshire
 2. Henry W. Keyes (R)
 3. Fred Brown (D)

New Jersey
 1. Hamilton Fish Kean (R)
 2. William Warren Barbour (R)

New Mexico
 1. Bronson M. Cutting (R)
 2. Sam G. Bratton (D), until June 24, 1933
 Carl Hatch (D), from October 10, 1933

New York
 1. Royal S. Copeland (D)
 3. Robert F. Wagner (D)

North Carolina
 2. Josiah William Bailey (D)
 3. Robert R. Reynolds (D)

North Dakota
 1. Lynn Frazier (R-NPL)
 3. Gerald P. Nye (R)

Ohio
 1. Simeon D. Fess (R)
 3. Robert J. Bulkley (D)

Oklahoma
 2. Thomas P. Gore (D)
 3. J. W. Elmer Thomas (D)

Oregon
 2. Charles L. McNary (R)
 3. Frederick Steiwer (R)

Pennsylvania
 1. David A. Reed (R)
 3. James J. Davis (R)

Rhode Island
 1. Felix Hebert (R)
 2. Jesse H. Metcalf (R)

South Carolina
 2. James F. Byrnes (D)
 3. Ellison D. Smith (D)

South Dakota
 2. William J. Bulow (D)
 3. Peter Norbeck (R)

Tennessee
 1. Kenneth D. McKellar (D)
 2. Nathan Lynn Bachman (D)

Texas
 1. Thomas T. Connally (D)
 2. Morris Sheppard (D)

Utah
 1. William H. King (D)
 3. Elbert D. Thomas (D)

Vermont
 1. Warren R. Austin (R)
 3. Porter H. Dale (R), until October 6, 1933
 Ernest W. Gibson (R), from November 21, 1933

Virginia
 1. Harry F. Byrd (D)
 2. Carter Glass (D)

Washington
 1. Clarence C. Dill (D)
 3. Homer T. Bone (D)

West Virginia
 1. Henry D. Hatfield (R)
 2. Matthew M. Neely (D)

Wisconsin
 1. Robert M. La Follette Jr. (R)
 3. F. Ryan Duffy (D)

Wyoming
 1. John B. Kendrick (D), until November 3, 1933
 Joseph C. O'Mahoney (D), from December 18, 1933
 2. Robert D. Carey (R)

House of Representatives
The names of members of the House of Representatives are preceded by their district numbers.

Alabama
 . John McDuffie (D)
 . J. Lister Hill (D)
 . Henry B. Steagall (D)
 . Lamar Jeffers (D)
 . Miles C. Allgood (D)
 . William B. Oliver (D)
 . William B. Bankhead (D)
 . Edward B. Almon (D), until June 22, 1933
 Archibald Hill Carmichael (D), from November 14, 1933
 . George Huddleston (D)

Arizona
 . Isabella Selmes Greenway (D), from October 3, 1933

Arkansas
 . William J. Driver (D)
 . John E. Miller (D)
 . Claude A. Fuller (D)
 . William B. Cravens (D)
 . Heartsill Ragon (D), until June 16, 1933
 David D. Terry (D), from December 19, 1933
 . David Delano Glover (D)
 . Tilman B. Parks (D)

California
 . Clarence F. Lea (D)
 . Harry L. Englebright (R)
 . Frank H. Buck (D)
 . Florence P. Kahn (R)
 . Richard J. Welch (R)
 . Albert E. Carter (R)
 . Ralph R. Eltse (R)
 . John J. McGrath (D)
 . Denver S. Church (D)
 . Henry E. Stubbs (D)
 . William E. Evans (R)
 . John H. Hoeppel (D)
 . Charles Kramer (D)
 . Thomas F. Ford (D)
 . William I. Traeger (R)
 . John F. Dockweiler (D)
 . Charles J. Colden (D)
 . John H. Burke (D)
 . Sam L. Collins (R)
 . George Burnham (R)

Colorado
 . Lawrence Lewis (D)
 . Fred N. Cummings (D)
 . John A. Martin (D)
 . Edward T. Taylor (D)

Connecticut
 . Charles M. Bakewell (R)
 . Herman P. Kopplemann (D)
 . William L. Higgins (R)
 . Francis T. Maloney (D)
 . Schuyler Merritt (R)
 . Edward W. Goss (R)

Delaware
 . Wilbur L. Adams (D)

Florida
 . William J. Sears (D)
 . J. Hardin Peterson (D)
 . Robert A. Green (D)
 . Millard F. Caldwell (D)
 . J. Mark Wilcox (D)

Georgia
 . Homer C. Parker (D)
 . Edward E. Cox (D)
 . Bryant T. Castellow (D)
 . Emmett M. Owen (D)
 . Robert Ramspeck (D)
 . Carl Vinson (D)
 . Malcolm C. Tarver (D)
 . Braswell Deen (D)
 . John S. Wood (D)
 . Charles H. Brand (D), until May 17, 1933
 Paul Brown (D), from July 5, 1933

Idaho
 . Compton I. White (D)
 . Thomas C. Coffin (D), until June 8, 1934

Illinois
 . Martin A. Brennan (D)
 . Walter Nesbit (D)
 . Oscar De Priest (R)
 . P. H. Moynihan (R)
 . Edward A. Kelly (D)
 . Harry P. Beam (D)
 . Adolph J. Sabath (D)
 . Thomas J. O’Brien (D)
 . Leonard W. Schuetz (D)
 . Leo Kocialkowski (D)
 . Frederick A. Britten (R)
 . James Simpson Jr. (R)
 . Frank R. Reid (R)
 . John T. Buckbee (R)
 . Leo E. Allen (R)
 . Chester C. Thompson (D)
 . J. Leroy Adair (D)
 . Everett M. Dirksen (R)
 . Frank Gillespie (D)
 . James A. Meeks (D)
 . Donald C. Dobbins (D)
 . Henry T. Rainey (D), until August 19, 1934
 . J. Earl Major (D), until October 6, 1933
 . Edwin M. Schaefer (D)
 . William W. Arnold (D)
 . Claude V. Parsons (D)
 . Kent E. Keller (D)

Indiana
 . William T. Schulte (D)
 . George R. Durgan (D)
 . Samuel B. Pettengill (D)
 . James I. Farley (D)
 . Glenn Griswold (D)
 . Virginia E. Jenckes (D)
 . Arthur H. Greenwood (D)
 . John W. Boehne Jr. (D)
 . Eugene B. Crowe (D)
 . Finly H. Gray (D)
 . William H. Larrabee (D)
 . Louis Ludlow (D)

Iowa
 . Edward C. Eicher (D)
 . Bernhard M. Jacobsen (D)
 . Albert C. Willford (D)
 . Fred Biermann (D)
 . Lloyd Thurston (R)
 . Cassius C. Dowell (R)
 . Otha D. Wearin (D)
 . Fred C. Gilchrist (R)
 . Guy M. Gillette (D)

Kansas
 . William P. Lambertson (R)
 . U. S. Guyer (R)
 . Harold Clement McGugin (R)
 . Randolph Carpenter (D)
 . William A. Ayres (D), until August 22, 1934
 . Kathryn O'Loughlin McCarthy (D)
 . Clifford R. Hope (R)

Kentucky
 . John Y. Brown Sr. (D)
 . Cap R. Carden (D)
 . Glover H. Cary (D)
 . Virgil Chapman (D)
 . W. Voris Gregory (D)
 . Finley Hamilton (D)
 . Andrew J. May (D)
 . Brent Spence (D)
 . Fred M. Vinson (D)

Louisiana
 . Joachim O. Fernandez (D)
 . Paul H. Maloney (D)
 . Numa F. Montet (D)
 . John N. Sandlin (D)
 . Riley J. Wilson (D)
 . Bolivar E. Kemp (D), until June 19, 1933
 Jared Y. Sanders Jr. (D), from May 1, 1934
 . René L. DeRouen (D)
 . Cleveland Dear (D)

Maine
 . Carroll L. Beedy (R)
 . Edward C. Moran Jr. (D)
 . John G. Utterback (D)

Maryland
 . T. Alan Goldsborough (D)
 . William P. Cole Jr. (D)
 . Vincent L. Palmisano (D)
 . Ambrose J. Kennedy (D)
 . Stephen W. Gambrill (D)
 . David J. Lewis (D)

Massachusetts
 . Allen T. Treadway (R)
 . William J. Granfield (D)
 . Frank H. Foss (R)
 . Pehr G. Holmes (R)
 . Edith Nourse Rogers (R)
 . A. Piatt Andrew Jr. (R)
 . William P. Connery Jr. (D)
 . Arthur D. Healey (D)
 . Robert Luce (R)
 . George H. Tinkham (R)
 . John J. Douglass (D)
 . John W. McCormack (D)
 . Richard B. Wigglesworth (R)
 . Joseph W. Martin Jr. (R)
 . Charles L. Gifford (R)

Michigan
 . George G. Sadowski (D)
 . John C. Lehr (D)
 . Joseph L. Hooper (R), until February 22, 1934
 . George Ernest Foulkes (D)
 . Carl E. Mapes (R)
 . Claude E. Cady (D)
 . Jesse P. Wolcott (R)
 . Michael J. Hart (D)
 . Harry W. Musselwhite (D)
 . Roy O. Woodruff (R)
 . Prentiss M. Brown (D)
 . W. Frank James (R)
 . Clarence J. McLeod (R)
 . Carl M. Weideman (D)
 . John D. Dingell Sr. (D)
 . John Lesinski Sr. (D)
 . George A. Dondero (R)

Minnesota
 . Henry M. Arens (FL)
 . Ray P. Chase (R)
 . Theodore Christianson (R)
 . Einar Hoidale (D)
 . Magnus Johnson (FL)
 . Harold Knutson (R)
 . Paul John Kvale (FL)
 . Ernest Lundeen (FL)
 . Francis Shoemaker (FL)

Mississippi
 . John E. Rankin (D)
 . Wall Doxey (D)
 . William M. Whittington (D)
 . T. Jeff Busby (D)
 . Ross A. Collins (D)
 . William M. Colmer (D)
 . Lawrence Russell Ellzey (D)

Missouri
 . Clarence Cannon (D)
 . James Robert Claiborne (D)
 . John J. Cochran (D)
 . Clement C. Dickinson (D)
 . Richard M. Duncan (D)
 . Frank H. Lee (D)
 . Ralph F. Lozier (D)
 . Jacob L. Milligan (D)
 . Milton A. Romjue (D)
 . James Edward Ruffin (D)
 . Joseph B. Shannon (D)
 . Clyde Williams (D)
 . Reuben T. Wood (D)

Montana
 . Joseph P. Monaghan (D)
 . Roy E. Ayers (D)

Nebraska
 . John H. Morehead (D)
 . Edward R. Burke (D)
 . Edgar Howard (D)
 . Ashton C. Shallenberger (D)
 . Terry Carpenter (D)

Nevada
 . James G. Scrugham (D)

New Hampshire
 . William Nathaniel Rogers (D)
 . Charles W. Tobey (R)

New Jersey
 . Charles A. Wolverton (R)
 . Isaac Bacharach (R)
 . William H. Sutphin (D)
 . D. Lane Powers (R)
 . Charles A. Eaton (R)
 . Donald H. McLean (R)
 . Randolph Perkins (R)
 . George N. Seger (R)
 . Edward A. Kenney (D)
 . Fred A. Hartley Jr. (R)
 . Peter A. Cavicchia (R)
 . Frederick R. Lehlbach (R)
 . Mary T. Norton (D)
 . Oscar L. Auf der Heide (D)

New Mexico
 . Dennis Chavez (D)

New York
 . John Fitzgibbons (D)
 . Elmer E. Studley (D)
 . Robert L. Bacon (R)
 . William F. Brunner (D)
 . George W. Lindsay (D)
 . Thomas H. Cullen (D)
 . Loring M. Black Jr. (D)
 . Andrew L. Somers (D)
 . John J. Delaney (D)
 . Patrick J. Carley (D)
 . Stephen A. Rudd (D)
 . Emanuel Celler (D)
 . Anning S. Prall (D)
 . Samuel Dickstein (D)
 . Christopher D. Sullivan (D)
 . William I. Sirovich (D)
 . John J. Boylan (D)
 . John J. O'Connor (D)
 . Theodore A. Peyser (D)
 . Martin J. Kennedy (D)
 . Sol Bloom (D)
 . James J. Lanzetta (D)
 . Joseph A. Gavagan (D)
 . Anthony J. Griffin (D)
 . Frank Oliver (D), until June 18, 1934
 . James M. Fitzpatrick (D)
 . Charles D. Millard (R)
 . Hamilton Fish III (R)
 . Philip A. Goodwin (R)
 . Parker Corning (D)
 . James S. Parker (R), until December 19, 1933
 William D. Thomas (R), from January 30, 1934
 . Frank Crowther (R)
 . Bertrand H. Snell (R)
 . Francis D. Culkin (R)
 . Fred J. Sisson (D)
 . John D. Clarke (R), until November 5, 1933
 Marian W. Clarke (R), from December 28, 1933
 . Clarence E. Hancock (R)
 . John Taber (R)
 . Gale H. Stalker (R)
 . James L. Whitley (R)
 . James W. Wadsworth Jr. (R)
 . Walter G. Andrews (R)
 . Alfred F. Beiter (D)
 . James M. Mead (D)
 . Daniel A. Reed (R)

North Carolina
 . Lindsay C. Warren (D)
 . John H. Kerr (D)
 . Charles Laban Abernethy (D)
 . Edward W. Pou (D), until April 1, 1934
 Harold D. Cooley (D), from July 7, 1934
 . Frank Hancock Jr. (D)
 . William B. Umstead (D)
 . J. Bayard Clark (D)
 . J. Walter Lambeth (D)
 . Robert L. Doughton (D)
 . Alfred L. Bulwinkle (D)
 . Zebulon Weaver (D)

North Dakota
 . William Lemke (R-NPL)
 . James H. Sinclair (R)

Ohio
 . Charles V. Truax (D)
 . Stephen M. Young (D)
 . John B. Hollister (R)
 . William E. Hess (R)
 . Byron B. Harlan (D)
 . Frank Le Blond Kloeb (D)
 . Frank C. Kniffin (D)
 . James G. Polk (D)
 . Leroy T. Marshall (R)
 . Thomas B. Fletcher (D)
 . Warren J. Duffey (D)
 . Thomas A. Jenkins (R)
 . Mell G. Underwood (D)
 . Arthur P. Lamneck (D)
 . William L. Fiesinger (D)
 . Dow W. Harter (D)
 . Robert T. Secrest (D)
 . William R. Thom (D)
 . Charles F. West (D)
 . Lawrence E. Imhoff (D)
 . John G. Cooper (R)
 . Martin L. Sweeney (D)
 . Robert Crosser (D)
 . Chester C. Bolton (R)

Oklahoma
 . Will Rogers (D)
 . Wesley E. Disney (D)
 . William W. Hastings (D)
 . Wilburn Cartwright (D)
 . Tom D. McKeown (D)
 . Fletcher B. Swank (D)
 . Jed Johnson (D)
 . James V. McClintic (D)
 . Ernest W. Marland (D)

Oregon
 . James W. Mott (R)
 . Walter M. Pierce (D)
 . Charles H. Martin (D)

Pennsylvania
 . Harry C. Ransley (R)
 . James M. Beck (R), until September 30, 1934
 . Alfred Marpole Waldron (R)
 . George Washington Edmonds (R)
 . James J. Connolly (R)
 . Edward Lowber Stokes (R)
 . George P. Darrow (R)
 . James Wolfenden (R)
 . Henry Winfield Watson (R), until August 27, 1933
 Oliver Walter Frey (D), from November 7, 1933
 . J. Roland Kinzer (R)
 . Patrick J. Boland (D)
 . C. Murray Turpin (R)
 . George F. Brumm (R), until May 29, 1934
 . William Emanuel Richardson (D)
 . Louis T. McFadden (R)
 . Robert F. Rich (R)
 . J. William Ditter (R)
 . Benjamin Kurtz Focht (R)
 . Isaac Hoffer Doutrich (R)
 . Thomas Cunningham Cochran (R)
 . Francis E. Walter (D)
 . Harry L. Haines (D)
 . J. Banks Kurtz (R)
 . J. Buell Snyder (D)
 . Charles I. Faddis (D)
 . J. Howard Swick (R)
 . Nathan L. Strong (R)
 . William M. Berlin (D)
 . Charles N. Crosby (D)
 . J. Twing Brooks (D)
 . M. Clyde Kelly (R)
 . Michael Joseph Muldowney (R)
 . Henry Ellenbogen (D)
 . Matthew A. Dunn (D)

Rhode Island
 . Francis B. Condon (D)
 . John M. O'Connell (D)

South Carolina
 . Thomas S. McMillan (D)
 . Hampton P. Fulmer (D)
 . John C. Taylor (D)
 . John J. McSwain (D)
 . James P. Richards (D)
 . Allard H. Gasque (D)

South Dakota
 . Fred H. Hildebrandt (D)
 . Theodore B. Werner (D)

Tennessee
 . B. Carroll Reece (R)
 . J. Will Taylor (R)
 . Sam D. McReynolds (D)
 . John Ridley Mitchell (D)
 . Joseph W. Byrns (D)
 . Clarence W. Turner (D)
 . Gordon Browning (D)
 . Jere Cooper (D)
 . Edward H. Crump (D)

Texas
 . Joseph Weldon Bailey Jr. (D)
 . Sterling Price Strong (D)
 . George Butler Terrell (D)
 . Wright Patman (D)
 . Martin Dies Jr. (D)
 . Morgan G. Sanders (D)
 . Sam Rayburn (D)
 . Hatton W. Sumners (D)
 . Luther A. Johnson (D)
 . Clay Stone Briggs (D), until April 29, 1933
 Clark W. Thompson (D), from June 24, 1933
 . Joe H. Eagle (D)
 . Joseph J. Mansfield (D)
 . James P. Buchanan (D)
 . Oliver H. Cross (D)
 . Fritz G. Lanham (D)
 . William D. McFarlane (D)
 . Richard M. Kleberg (D)
 . Milton H. West (D), from April 22, 1933
 . R. Ewing Thomason (D)
 . Thomas L. Blanton (D)
 . Marvin Jones (D)

Utah
 . Abe Murdock (D)
 . J. W. Robinson (D)

Vermont
 . Ernest W. Gibson (R), until October 19, 1933
 Charles A. Plumley (R), from January 16, 1934

Virginia
 . S. Otis Bland (D)
 . Thomas G. Burch (D)
 . Colgate W. Darden Jr. (D)
 . Patrick H. Drewry (D)
 . John W. Flannagan Jr. (D)
 . Andrew J. Montague (D)
 . A. Willis Robertson (D)
 . Howard W. Smith (D)
 . Clifton A. Woodrum (D)

Washington
 . Marion Anthony Zioncheck (D)
 . Monrad C. Wallgren (D)
 . Martin F. Smith (D)
 . Knute Hill (D)
 . Samuel Billingsley Hill (D)
 . Wesley Lloyd (D)

West Virginia
 . Robert L. Ramsay (D)
 . Jennings Randolph (D)
 . Lynn Hornor (D), until September 23, 1933
 Andrew Edmiston Jr. (D), from November 28, 1933
 . George William Johnson (D)
 . John Kee (D)
 . Joe L. Smith (D)

Wisconsin
 . George Washington Blanchard (R)
 . Charles W. Henney (D)
 . Gardner R. Withrow (R)
 . Raymond Joseph Cannon (D)
 . Thomas David Patrick O'Malley (D)
 . Michael K. Reilly (D)
 . Gerald J. Boileau (R)
 . James Frederic Hughes (D)
 . James A. Frear (R)
 . Hubert H. Peavey (R)

Wyoming
 . Vincent Carter (R)

Non-voting members
 . Anthony J. Dimond (D)
 . Lincoln L. McCandless (D)
 Philippines: Pedro Guevara (Nac.)
 Philippines: Camilo Osías (Nac.)
 Puerto Rico: Santiago Iglesias (Coalitionist)

Changes in membership

Senate

|-
| Montana(2)
| Vacant
| Thomas J. Walsh (D) died in office.Successor appointed March 13, 1933, to continue the term.Successor later lost nomination to finish the term, see below.
|  | John Erickson (D)
| March 13, 1933

|-
| Nebraska(1)
|  | Robert Howell (R)
| Died March 11, 1933.Successor appointed May 24, 1933, to continue the term.Successor later retired, see below.
|  | William H. Thompson (D)
| May 24, 1933

|-
| New Mexico(2)
|  | Sam Bratton (D)
| Resigned June 24, 1933, when appointed Judge of the U.S. Court of Appeals.Successor appointed October 10, 1933, and then elected November 6, 1934.
|  | Carl Hatch (D)
| October 10, 1933

|-
| Vermont(3)
|  | Porter Dale (R)
| Died October 6, 1933.Successor appointed November 21, 1933, and then elected January 17, 1934.
|  | Ernest Gibson (R)
| November 21, 1933

|-
| Wyoming(1)
|  | John Kendrick (D)
| Died November 3, 1933.Successor appointed December 18, 1933, to finish the term.
|  nowrap | Joseph C. O'Mahoney (D)
| January 1, 1934

|-
| Nebraska(1)
|  nowrap | William Thompson (D)
| Interim appointee did not run in the special election to finish the term.Successor elected November 6, 1934.
|  | Richard Hunter (D)
| November 7, 1934

|-
| Montana(2)
|  | John Erickson (D)
| Interim appointee lost nomination to finish the term.Successor elected November 6, 1934.
|  | James E. Murray (D)
| November 7, 1934

|}

House of Representatives

|-
| 
| Vacant
| John Garner had resigned at the end of the previous Congress
|  | Milton H. West
| April 22, 1933
|-
| 
| Vacant
| Lewis W. Douglas (D) had resigned at the end of the previous Congress
|  | Isabella Greenway (D)
| October 3, 1933
|-
| 
|  | Clay Stone Briggs (D)
| Died April 29, 1933
|  | Clark W. Thompson (D)
| June 24, 1933
|-
| Arkansas 5th
|  | Heartsill Ragon (D)
| Resigned May 12, 1933, upon appointment as a judge of the United States District Court for the Western District of Arkansas
|  | David D. Terry (D)
| December 19, 1933
|-
| 
|  | Charles H. Brand (D)
| Died May 17, 1933
|  | Paul Brown (D)
| July 5, 1933
|-
| 
|  | Bolivar E. Kemp (D)
| Died June 19, 1933
|  | Jared Y. Sanders Jr. (D)
| May 1, 1934
|-
| 
|  | Edward B. Almon (D)
| Died June 22, 1933
|  | Archibald Hill Carmichael (D)
| November 14, 1933
|-
| 
|  | Henry Winfield Watson (R)
| Died August 27, 1933
|  | Oliver Walter Frey (D)
| November 7, 1933
|-
| 
|  | Lynn Hornor (D)
| Died September 23, 1933
|  | Andrew Edmiston Jr. (D)
| November 28, 1933
|-
| 
|  | J. Earl Major (D)
| appointed as a judge of the United States District Court for the Southern District of Illinois October 6, 1933
| colspan=2 | Seat remained vacant until next Congress
|-
| 
|  | Ernest W. Gibson (R)
| Appointed U.S. Senator October 19, 1933
|  | Charles A. Plumley (R)
| January 16, 1934
|-
| 
|  | John D. Clarke (R)
| Died November 5, 1933
|  | Marian W. Clarke (R)
| December 28, 1933
|-
| 
|  | James S. Parker (R)
| Died December 19, 1933
|  | William D. Thomas (R)
| January 30, 1934
|-
| 
|  | Joseph L. Hooper (R)
| Died February 22, 1934
| colspan=2 | Seat remained vacant until next Congress
|-
| 
|  | Edward W. Pou (D)
| Died April 1, 1934
|  | Harold D. Cooley (D)
| July 7, 1934
|-
| 
|  | George F. Brumm (R)
| Died May 29, 1934
| colspan=2 | Seat remained vacant until next Congress
|-
| Idaho 2nd
|  | Thomas C. Coffin (D)
| Died June 8, 1934
| colspan=2 | Seat remained vacant until next Congress
|-
| 
|  | Frank Oliver (D)
| Resigned June 18, 1934
| colspan=2 | Seat remained vacant until next Congress
|-
| 
|  | Henry T. Rainey (D)
| Died August 19, 1934
| colspan=2 | Seat remained vacant until next Congress
|-
| 
|  | William A. Ayres (D)
| Resigned August 22, 1934, after being appointed a member of the Federal Trade Commission
| colspan=2 | Seat remained vacant until next Congress
|-
| 
|  | James M. Beck (R)
| Resigned September 30, 1934
| colspan=2 | Seat remained vacant until next Congress
|}

Committees

Senate

 Agriculture and Forestry (Chairman: Ellison D. Smith; Ranking Member: George W. Norris)
 Air Mail and Ocean Mail Contracts (Special)
 Alaska Railroad (Special Select)
 Appropriations (Chairman: Carter Glass; Ranking Member: Frederick Hale)
 Audit and Control the Contingent Expenses of the Senate (Chairman: James F. Byrnes; Ranking Member: John G. Townsend Jr.)
 Banking and Currency (Chairman: Duncan U. Fletcher; Ranking Member: Peter Norbeck)
 Bankruptcy and Receiveship (Select)
 Campaign Expenditures (Select) 
 Civil Service (Chairman: William J. Bulow; Ranking Member: Porter H. Dale)
 Claims (Chairman: Josiah W. Bailey; Ranking Member: Arthur Capper)
 Commerce (Chairman: Hubert D. Stephens; Ranking Member: Charles L. McNary)
 District of Columbia (Chairman: William H. King; Ranking Member: Arthur Capper)
 Education and Labor (Chairman: David I. Walsh; Ranking Member: William E. Borah)
 Enrolled Bills (Chairman: Hattie W. Caraway; Ranking Member: Arthur H. Vandenberg)
 Expenditures in Executive Departments (Chairman: J. Hamilton Lewis; Ranking Member: Daniel O. Hastings)
 Finance (Chairman: Pat Harrison; Ranking Member: David A. Reed)
 Foreign Relations (Chairman: Key Pittman; Ranking Member: William E. Borah)
 Immigration (Chairman: Marcus A. Coolidge; Ranking Member: Hiram W. Johnson)
 Indian Affairs (Chairman: Burton K. Wheeler; Ranking Member: Lynn J. Frazier)
 Interoceanic Canals (Chairman: Thomas P. Gore; Ranking Member: Thomas D. Schall)
 Interstate Commerce (Chairman: Clarence C. Dill; Ranking Member: James Couzens)
 Irrigation and Reclamation (Chairman: Alva B. Adams; Ranking Member: Charles L. McNary)
 Judiciary (Chairman: Henry F. Ashurst; Ranking Member: William E. Borah)
 Library (Chairman: Alben W. Barkley; Ranking Member: Simeon D. Fess)
 Manufactures (Chairman: Robert J. Bulkley; Ranking Member: Charles L. McNary)
 Military Affairs (Chairman: Morris Sheppard; Ranking Member: David A. Reed)
 Mines and Mining (Chairman: M.M. Logan; Ranking Member: Arthur B. Robinson)
 Mississippi Flood Control Project (Select) (Chairman: Robert F. Wagner)
 Munitions Industry (Select) (Chairman: Gerald P. Nye)
 Naval Affairs (Chairman: Park Trammell; Ranking Member: Frederick Hale)
 Patents (Chairman: William G. McAdoo; Ranking Member: George W. Norris)
 Pensions (Chairman: George McGill; Ranking Member: Thomas D. Schall)
 Philippines Economic Condition (Special)
 Post Office and Post Roads (Chairman: Kenneth McKellar; Ranking Member: Porter H. Dale)
 Presidential and Senatorial Campaign Expenditures (Special) (Chairman: Tom Connally)
 Printing (Chairman: Carl Hayden; Ranking Member: Arthur H. Vandenberg)
 Privileges and Elections (Chairman: Walter F. George; Ranking Member: Daniel O. Hastings)
 Public Buildings and Grounds (Chairman: Tom Connally; Ranking Member: Henry W. Keyes)
 Public Lands and Surveys (Chairman: Robert F. Wagner; Ranking Member: Peter Norbeck)
 Rules (Chairman: Royal S. Copeland; Ranking Member: Frederick Hale)
 Territories and Insular Affairs (Chairman: Millard E. Tydings; Ranking Member: Hiram W. Johnson)
 Whole
 Wildlife Resources (Special) (Chairman: Frederic C. Walcott)

House of Representatives

 Accounts (Chairman: Lindsay C. Warren; Ranking Member: James Wolfenden)
 Agriculture (Chairman: J. Marvin Jones; Ranking Member: John D. Clarke)
 Appropriations (Chairman: James P. Buchanan; Ranking Member: John Taber)
 Banking and Currency (Chairman: Henry B. Steagall; Ranking Member: Robert Luce)
 Census (Chairman: Ralph F. Lozier; Ranking Member: J. Roland Kinzer)
 Civil Service (Chairman: Lamar Jeffers; Ranking Member: Frederick R. Lehlbach)
 Claims (Chairman: Loring M. Black Jr.; Ranking Member: Ulysses S. Guyer)
 Coinage, Weights and Measures (Chairman: Andrew L. Somers; Ranking Member: Randolph Perkins)
 Conservation of Wildlife Resources (Select) (Chairman: A. Willis Robertson)
 Disposition of Executive Papers (Chairman: Robert A. Green; Ranking Member: N/A)
 District of Columbia (Chairman: Mary T. Norton; Ranking Member: Gale Stalker)
 Education (Chairman: John J. Douglass; Ranking Member: James L. Whitley)
 Election of the President, Vice President and Representatives in Congress (Chairman: Patrick J. Carley; Ranking Member: Charles L. Gifford)
 Elections No.#1 (Chairman: J. Bayard Clark; Ranking Member: John B. Hollister)
 Elections No.#2 (Chairman: Joseph A. Gavagan; Ranking Member: Joseph L. Hooper)
 Elections No.#3 (Chairman: John H. Kerr; Ranking Member: Charles L. Gifford)
 Enrolled Bills (Chairman: Claude V. Parsons; Ranking Member: Oscar Stanton De Priest)
 Expenditures in the Executive Departments (Chairman: John J. Cochran; Ranking Member: Charles L. Gifford)
 Flood Control (Chairman: Riley J. Wilson; Ranking Member: Frank R. Reid)
 Foreign Affairs (Chairman: Sam D. McReynolds; Ranking Member: Hamilton Fish III)
 Immigration and Naturalization (Chairman: Samuel Dickstein; Ranking Member: J. Will Taylor)
 Indian Affairs (Chairman: Edgar Howard; Ranking Member: Hubert H. Peavey)
 Insular Affairs (Chairman: John McDuffie; Ranking Member: Carroll L. Beedy)
 Interstate and Foreign Commerce (Chairman: Sam Rayburn; Ranking Member: James S. Parker then John G. Cooper)
 Invalid Pensions (Chairman: Mell G. Underwood; Ranking Member: Oscar Stanton De Priest)
 Investigate Real Estate Beholder's Reorganizations (Select) (Chairman: N/A)
 Irrigation and Reclamation (Chairman: Dennis Chavez; Ranking Member: Vincent Carter)
 Judiciary (Chairman: Hatton W. Sumners; Ranking Member: J. Banks Kurtz)
 Labor (Chairman: William P. Connery Jr.; Ranking Member: Richard J. Welch)
 Library (Chairman: Kent E. Keller; Ranking Member: Robert Luce)
 Memorials (Chairman: John H. Morehead; Ranking Member: Frank Crowther)
 Merchant Marine, Radio and Fisheries (Chairman: S. Otis Bland; Ranking Member: Frederick R. Lehlbach)
 Military Affairs (Chairman: John J. McSwain; Ranking Member: W. Frank James)
 Mines and Mining (Chairman: Joe L. Smith; Ranking Member: Harry Lane Englebright)
 Naval Affairs (Chairman: Carl Vinson; Ranking Member: Frederick A. Britten)
 Patents (Chairman: William I. Sirovich; Ranking Member: Randolph Perkins)
 Pensions (Chairman: Allard H. Gasque; Ranking Member: Gale Stalker)
 Post Office and Post Roads (Chairman: James M. Mead; Ranking Member: Clyde Kelly)
 Printing (Chairman: J. Walter Lambeth; Ranking Member: Robert F. Rich)
 Public Buildings and Grounds (Chairman: Fritz G. Lanham; Ranking Member: J. Will Taylor)
 Public Lands (Chairman: Rene L. DeRouen; Ranking Member: Harry Lane Englebright)
 Revision of Laws (Chairman: Byron B. Harlan; Ranking Member: Frank R. Reid)
 Rivers and Harbors (Chairman: Joseph J. Mansfield; Ranking Member: Nathan L. Strong) 
 Roads (Chairman: Wilburn Cartwright; Ranking Member: C. Murray Turpin)
 Rules (Chairman: William B. Bankhead; Ranking Member: Harry C. Ransley)
 Standards of Official Conduct
 Territories (Chairman: Robert A. Green; Ranking Member: Ernest W. Gibson)
 War Claims (Chairman: Miles C. Allgood; Ranking Member: James H. Sinclair)
 Ways and Means (Chairman: Robert L. Doughton; Ranking Member: Allen T. Treadway)
 World War Veterans' Legislation (Chairman: John E. Rankin; Ranking Member: Robert Luce)
 Whole

Joint committees

 Conditions of Indian Tribes (Special)
 Disposition of (Useless) Executive Papers
 Investigate Dirigible Disasters (Chairman: Sen. William H. King; Vice Chairman: Rep. )
 Printing (Chairman: Sen. Duncan U. Fletcher; Vice Chairman: Rep. J. Walter Lambeth)
 The Library (Chairman: Sen. Alben W. Barkley)
 Taxation (Chairman: Sen. Pat Harrison)

Caucuses
 Democratic (House)
 Democratic (Senate)

Employees

Legislative branch agency directors
 Architect of the Capitol: David Lynn
 Attending Physician of the United States Congress: George Calver
 Comptroller General of the United States: John R. McCarl 
 Librarian of Congress: Herbert Putnam 
 Public Printer of the United States: George H. Carter, until 1934 
 Augustus E. Giegengack, from 1934

Senate
Secretary: Edwin A. Halsey
Librarian: James D. Preston
Chaplain: ZeBarney Thorne Phillips (Episcopalian)
Sergeant at Arms: Chesley W. Jurney
Democratic Party Secretary: Leslie Biffle
Republican Party Secretary: Carl A. Loeffler

House of Representatives
Employees include:

Clerk: South Trimble
Chaplain: James Shera Montgomery (Methodist)
Parliamentarian: Lewis Deschler
Reading Clerks: Patrick Joseph Haltigan (D) and Alney E. Chaffee (R)
Sergeant at Arms: Kenneth Romney
Doorkeeper: Joseph J. Sinnott

See also 
 1932 United States elections (elections leading to this Congress)
 1932 United States presidential election
 1932 United States Senate elections
 1932 United States House of Representatives elections
 1934 United States elections (elections during this Congress, leading to the next Congress)
 1934 United States Senate elections
 1934 United States House of Representatives elections

References